Miss Universe United Kingdom 2008, the 3rd Miss Universe United Kingdom pageant, was held at London's Cafe De Paris, London, United Kingdom on 4 May 2008. Julie Doherty of England crowned her successor Lisa Lazarus of Llanelli at the end of the event. That year only 50 candidates competed for the national crown. The chosen winner represented the United Kingdom at Miss Universe 2008. The runner up represented the country in different International pageants.

Results

Special Awards

Contestants

Notes

Withdrawals

External links
http://www.missuniversegb.co.uk
http://www.contesera.com/2008/05/model-lisa-lasarus-is-miss-uk-universe.html

Miss Universe Great Britain